The County of Brant (2021 population 39,474) is a single-tier municipality in the Canadian province of Ontario. Although it retains the word "county" in its name, the municipality is a single-tier municipal government and has no upper tier. The County of Brant has service offices in Burford, Paris, Oakland, Onondaga and St. George. The largest population centre (2021 population 14,956) is Paris.

The County of Brant is a predominantly rural municipality in Southern Ontario. The County is bordered by the township of North Dumfries in the Regional Municipality of Waterloo; the City of Hamilton; Haldimand County; Norfolk County; and the townships of Blandford-Blenheim and Norwich in Oxford County. The County abuts the provincially-mandated Greenbelt. Although the city of Brantford is surrounded by the County, it is a fully independent city with its own municipal government. The Brant census division, which includes Brantford and the Six Nations and New Credit reserves along with the County of Brant, had a population of 144,771 in the 2021 census.

The County is named after Joseph Brant and was established in 1851. Brantford separated from the County when it incorporated as a city in 1877. Part of the County is situated on the Haldimand Tract, traditional territory of the Neutral, Mississauga, and Haudenosaunee peoples.

History 
The area had previously been part of Wentworth and Oxford County. Brant County was formed in 1851 and originally consisted of:
Brantford Township (Brantford, Paris, Mount Pleasant, Cainsville), Area . First settlement made before 1810. The township was organized in 1840.
Burford Township (Burford, Scotland), Area . First of the midland townships to have settlers. Surveyed in 1793, four families settled on the land before 1800.
Oakland Township (Scotland, Oakland), Area . Originally called the Townsend Gore, then the Burford Gore, but organized a separate municipality in 1850.
Onondaga Township (Onondaga, Middleport), Area . First settled in 1838 within Oxford County. The formal surrender of the township by the Indians did not take place until 1839.
South Dumfries Township (Paris, St. George, Glen Morris), Area .
Tuscarora Township (Six Nations Indian Reserve, New Credit Indian Reserve), created in 1784.

On January 1, 1999, the Town of Paris and the townships of Brantford, Burford, Oakland, Onondaga, and South Dumfries amalgamated to form a new city with the official legal name of County of Brant.

Early history 
Erected by the provincial and federal governments, historic plaques and monuments in Brant County indicate a long and varied history which include many aspects related to the First Nations.

The Mohawk Chief Joseph Brant (Thayendanega) and the Mohawk people of New York state served with the British during the American Revolution. In 1784, the Crown granted Joseph Brant and his followers a land treaty along the Grand River to replace what they had lost in New York State at the Sandusky Council after the Revolution. Much of this grant was later rescinded. As chief of the united tribes, Brant led his people—including Brant's African slaves captured during the revolution—to Upper Canada; a group of 400 settled in 1788 on the Grand River at Mohawk Village which later became Brantford. Nearly a century later (1886), the Joseph Brant Memorial would be erected in Burlington, Ontario in honour of Brant and the Six Nations Confederacy.

The Mohawk Chapel, built by the British Crown in 1785 for the Mohawk and Iroquois people (Six Nations of the Grand River), was dedicated in 1788 as a reminder of the original agreements made with the British during the American Revolution. 
In 1904 the chapel received Royal status by King Edward VII in memory of the longstanding alliance. Her Majesty's Royal Chapel of the Mohawks is an important reminder of the original agreements made with Queen Anne in 1710. It is still in use today as one of two royal Chapels in Canada and the oldest Protestant Church in the province. Joseph Brant and his son John Brant are buried here.

Significant to the County, gypsum was discovered in 1793 on the east bank of the Grand River in what became Paris during a survey for the British Home Department. By late 1794 a road had been built from what is now Dundas, Ontario to Paris, called The Governor's Road (now Dundas St. in Paris). Records from 1846 indicate that the settlement (now Paris), in a hilly area called Oak Plains, was divided into the upper town and the lower town. In addition to successful farmers in the area, the community of 1000 people (Americans, Scottish, English, and Irish) was thriving. Manufacturing had already begun, with industries powered by the river. A great deal of plaster was being exported and there were three mills, a tannery, a woolen factory, a foundry, and numerous tradesmen. Five churches had been built; the post office was receiving mail three times a week. The village was incorporated in 1850 with Hiram "Boss" Capron as the first Reeve. It was incorporated as a town in 1856 with H. Finlayson as the first mayor.

Abraham Dayton from Connecticut arrived in 1793 and was granted the entire township of Burford; additional settlers began arriving in 1797. The 1814 Battle of Malcolm's Mills during the War of 1812 took place at what is now Oakland when American forces attacked the local regiments. Neither this battle nor the 1837 Duncombe's Uprising by militant "Patriots" at the settlement of Scotland were successful.

Chief John Brant (Mohawk leader) (Ahyonwaeghs) who had lived at Mohawk Village was one of the sons of Joseph Brant. He fought with the British during the War of 1812 and later worked to improve the welfare of the First Nations. He was involved in building schools and was the improving the welfare of his people. Brant initiated the opening of schools and from 1828 served as the first native Superintendent of the Six Nations. Chief Brant was elected to Legislative Assembly of Upper Canada for Haldimand in 1830 and was the first aboriginal Canadian in Parliament.

Records from 1846 indicate that the settlement of Scotland in Burford Township had a population of about 150. At that time there were two stores, two taverns, one tannery, one saddler, one chair maker, one cabinet maker, one blacksmith. There was also a carding machine and fulling mill near the village. Nearby Oakland had about 160 inhabitants; its post office was receiving mail daily. Oakland had a grist and a saw mill, a carding machine and fulling mill, one store, two taverns, one hatter, one wagon maker, one blacksmith, one tailor, one shoemaker.

Much of the County's early population began arriving in the 1820s as the Hamilton and London Road was improved and settlement increased after 1848 when navigation to Brantford was opened and again in 1854 with the arrival of the railway to Brantford. The stone and brick Brant County Courthouse was built on land purchased from the Six Nations in 1852. The structure housed court rooms, county offices, a law library and a gaol. During additions in the 1880s, the Greek Revival style, with Doric columns, was retained.

Chiefswood, now a Six Nations museum in Oshweken and one of the National Historic Sites of Canada, was built in about 1856 by Mohawk Chief George Henry Martin Johnson (Onwanonsyshon). His daughter, the Mohawk poet E. Pauline Johnson (Tekahionwake), gained great acclaim across Canada. Her work increased awareness of the history and cultural diversity of the First Nations. In 1886, the Joseph Brant Memorial was constructed in honour of Brant and the Six Nations Confederacy.

Railway development

Brant County saw relatively early railway development in Ontario's history, as it lay nearby and between major mid-19th century centres such as Toronto and London. Plans for railway development were underway in the 1830s as part of the proposed London and Gore Railroad between London and Hamilton, with a branch line planned to extend northward to Galt. After significant delays, the London and Gore eventually appeared in the form of the Great Western Railway, whose mainline opened between Hamilton and London in 1853.

Work had begun on the branch line to Galt in 1852, and it was completed in 1854. The branch line, as built, connected to the roughly east–west mainline at a junction in Brant County located at a key point aligned between four major manufacturing and administrative centres in the area: Brantford, Galt, Hamilton, and London. Originally known simply as Fairchild Creek Station, the railway town which grew up around the junction was eventually named Harrisburg after the then-president of the Great Western Railway, Robert W. Harris. This early construction date has led to some Ontario rail history writers such as Joachim Brouwer and Ron Brown to argue that Harrisburg was the first railway junction in Canada, and that the branch line to Galt was the first branch line in Canadian railway history. A second branch line, this one to Brantford, was also built south from Harrisburg in 1871, though an independent shortline named the Buffalo, Brantford and Goderich Railway reached Brantford earlier, in the 1850s.

Invention of the telephone 
Alexander Graham Bell invented the telephone at his father's homestead, Melville House, now the Bell Homestead National Historic Site. At the time, the homestead was in the County, outside the Brantford city limits. In a 1906 speech, Bell made the following comment, "the telephone problem was solved, and it was solved at my father's home".  As well, two of the first successful voice transmissions of any notable distance were made in early August 1876, between the telegraph office in Brantford, Ontario and Melville House and Between Paris and Brantford.

Canada's first telephone factory, created and operated by James Cowherd, was also located in Brantford from about 1879 until his death in 1881.  The first telephone business office which opened in 1877, not far from the Bell Homestead, was then located in the County just outside Brantford.

Geography

Communities 

In addition to Brantford, population centres in Brant are Paris, St. George and Burford. Smaller communities in the municipality include Bishopsgate, Burtch, Cainsville, Cathcart, East Oakland, Etonia, Fairfield, Falkland, Glen Morris, Gobles, Harley, Harrisburg, Hatchley, Langford, Lockie, Maple Grove, Middleport, Mount Pleasant, Mount Vernon, New Durham, Newport, Northfield, Northfield Centre, Oakland, Onondaga, Osborne Corners, and Scotland.

Climate

Demographics 

Government 
The County of Brant is divided into five wards, each with two elected Councillors. David Bailey was elected as the Mayor in 2018. Previously, Ronald Eddy had held the position of Mayor from 1999 - 2018. The County is a single-tier municipality and provide the following services: roads, water, wastewater, garbage, recycling, facilities, parks, trails, planning, building, economic development, tourism, bylaw enforcement, library, fire and paramedic services but contracts with the Ontario Provincial Police to provide police services, overseen by the Police Services Board. (Ambulance services are provided in conjunction with the City of Brantford.) The customer service offices are located in Burford, Paris, Oakland, Onondaga and St. George Ontario.

Local organizations 
Local organizations include the Kinsmen Club of Brantford is an all Canadian non-profit service organization that promotes service, fellowship, positive values, and national pride.
They put on the Brantford Kinsmen Annual Car Show & Swap Meet in Paris Ontario in September and the Brantford Kinsmen Annual Ribfest in Brantford, Ontario to help raise funds for local charities. And Sustainable Brant dedicated to saving the disappearing farmland.

The County of Brant Public Library is the public library serving the communities in the county of Brant, Ontario, Canada. It has 5 branches located in Paris, Burford, Scotland, St. George, and Glen Morris, Ontario. The system's main branch, in Paris, Ontario, was originally a Carnegie Library, having received an endowment from Carnegie in 1902. The County of Brant Public Library maintains a Digital Historical Collection pertaining to Brant history at http://images.ourontario.ca/brant

The Women Teachers of Ontario, Brant Branch: https://rwto.org/branch/brant/

Album of honour 

The Album of Honour for Brant County is a book compiled in 1946 by the Kinsmen Club of Brantford to commemorate those of Brantford, the County of Brant and the peoples of the Six Nations who served Canada during the Second World War.  The book lists the names of the Brant County men and women who served in World War II. There are more than 3,500 photographs. In addition, local companies provided the names of employees who served in this war. The book is kept on the Digital Archives Page at the Brantford Public Library.

See also 
List of townships in Ontario
List of secondary schools in Ontario#Brant County

Notes

References

External links 

 
Cities in Ontario
Single-tier municipalities in Ontario
Southwestern Ontario